Marry Me, Marry You is a Philippine drama romantic comedy television series broadcast by Kapamilya Channel, A2Z and TV5. It aired from September 13, 2021 to January 21, 2022 on the network's Primetime Bida evening block and worldwide via The Filipino Channel, replacing Init sa Magdamag.

Series overview

 iWantTFC shows two episodes first in advance before its television broadcast.

Episodes

Season 1

Season 2

References

Lists of Philippine drama television series episodes